Nades is a commune in the Allier department in the Auvergne region in central France.

Population

See also
Communes of the Allier department

References

Communes of Allier
Allier communes articles needing translation from French Wikipedia